Lwów is the Polish name for Lviv, Ukraine; a city formerly in the Polish-Lithuanian Commonwealth. 

Lwów or Lwow may also refer to:

Places
 Lwów Ghetto, a Nazi ghetto
 Lwów Land, an administrative unit of the Kingdom of Poland
 Lwów Voivodeship, a voivodeship (province) of the Second Polish Republic, from 1918 to 1939
 Lwów Voivodeship (1944–1945), a voivodeship (province) of Poland from 1944 to 1945
 Lwówek Śląski, a town in the Lower Silesian Voivodeship
 Haren, Germany, briefly known as Lwów in 1945, as part of the Polish occupation zone in Germany

Other uses
 Lwów (ship), an 1868 Polish sailing ship
 Lwów Eaglets, a term of affection that is applied to the Polish child soldiers who defended the city of Lwów
 Lwów Oath, an oath made on April 1, 1656 by Polish king John II Casimir
 Lwów School of Mathematics, a group of Polish mathematicians

See also

 Lwów pogrom (disambiguation)
 Battle of Lwów (disambiguation)
 
 
 
Lvov (disambiguation), including the surname Lwow/Lwowa
Lviv (disambiguation)
Lemberg (disambiguation)